The 1969–70 Norwegian 1. Divisjon season was the 31st season of ice hockey in Norway. Eight teams participated in the league, and Valerenga Ishockey won the championship.

Regular season

External links 
 Norwegian Ice Hockey Federation

Nor
GET-ligaen seasons
1969 in Norwegian sport
1970 in Norwegian sport